Areas is a genus of tiger moths in the family Erebidae.

Species
Areas galactina (Hoeven, 1840)

Subgenus Melanareas Butler, 1889 
Areas imperialis (Kollar, [1844])

References
 , 2009: Subspecies of Areas galactina (Hoeven, 1840) (Lepidoptera, Arctiidae): 25 years after H.Inoue's review. Tinea 20 (5): 316-329.
Natural History Museum Lepidoptera generic names catalog

Spilosomina
Moth genera